Knight High School is a four-year public high school located in Palmdale, California and is part of the Antelope Valley Union High School District. Knight High was the 7th general education school to join the district. The high school opened its doors to freshmen in August 2003 and these same freshmen were the first class to graduate, graduating on May 31, 2007. The high school was named after test pilot and politician William J. "Pete" Knight. The school has received much recognition for its band program which has placed first in many events. Knight High School has an approximate enrollment of 3,100 students.

Advanced Placement program
Knight High has many different Advanced Placement programs, and college-bound courses, meant to ensure a direct path to college with their school vision being that "Every student at Knight High School will have the option of attending a four-year college or university." Knight High School currently has the largest enrollment in Advanced Placement classes of any of the high schools in the AV Union High School District. Knight also has the highest number of students receiving scores of 3 or higher on Advanced Placement (AP) exams. In September 2007, Knight High had 28 students recognized by the College Board as AP Scholars.

Knight High School has an extensive AP (Advanced Placement) program. Students may take AP classes in many classes, including, but not limited to: English 11, English 12, Statistics, Calculus, World History, US History, United States Government, Computer Science, Physics, Chemistry, Biology, and Studio Art.

Athletics

In the school's short history, it has enjoyed much success in athletics competing in the Golden League (comprising the eight public High Schools in the Antelope Valley).  The Hawks have been crowned Golden League Champions in Football, Boys and Girls Basketball, Boys Soccer, Boys and Girls Track and Field, Boys Cross Country, and Softball.

Golden League Championships won:

 Girls Basketball 2007, 2008, 2009 (undefeated league record), 2014, 2018
 Boys Basketball 2007, 2008, 2010, 2011, 2015, 2017, 2018, 2019
 Softball 2009, 2011, 2016
 Boys Track and Field 2007, 2010, 2011,
 Girls Track and Field 2007, 2011, 2013
 Football 2011
 Boys Soccer 2011, 2012, 2014, 2015, 2019
 Girls Cross Country 2013
 Wrestling 2018

During the 2007-08 season the Boys Basketball team coached by Tom Hegre advanced to the CIF-SS Division IIA Finals held at the Honda Center in Anaheim, CA.  They also earned a berth in the Division I State playoffs.  Senior Forward, Paul George was named Golden League MVP (and Antelope Valley Press Player of the Year) and was also named to the All-CIF team. George went on to start for Fresno State and was taken by the Indiana Pacers with the 10th Pick in 2010 NBA Draft.

The girls basketball team advanced to the CIF-SS Division IIA Semi-finals during the 2007-08 season.  Junior Forward, Malika Jackson was named Golden League MVP (and Antelope Valley Press Player of the Year).  Jackson was also named to the All-CIF team along with teammates Anttanisha Moton and Dominique Turner.

Notable alumni
 Paul George professional NBA All-Star forward for the Los Angeles Clippers

References

External links
Knight High School Website
Clubs & Organizations

High schools in Los Angeles County, California
Public high schools in California
Education in Palmdale, California
2003 establishments in California
Educational institutions established in 2003